44 class may refer to:

British Rail Class 44
DRG Class 44
New South Wales 44 class locomotive